Nemesi Marquès Oste (born 17 May 1935) was the personal representative to Andorra of the Bishop of Urgell, who is one of the co-princes of Andorra. He is a Roman Catholic priest, and has been rector of Bellestar, a village of 55 inhabitants.

He was succeeded as representative of the episcopal co-prince by Josep Maria Mauri on 20 July 2012.

See also 
List of national leaders
Politics of Andorra

References

1935 births
Living people
Spanish Roman Catholic priests